Chu Tien-wen (born 24 August 1956) is a Taiwanese fiction writer. Chu is perhaps best known for writing the screenplays for most Hou Hsiao-hsien films. She is the recipient of the 2015 Newman Prize for Chinese Literature.

Her father Chu Hsi-ning and younger sister Chu Tien-hsin are also famous writers.

Biography
Chu Tien-wen was born in Taipei, Taiwan. She was born to probably the most prestigious literary family in contemporary Taiwan. She is the daughter of Chu Hsi-ning and the older sister of Chu Tien-hsin. Her teacher was Hu Lancheng, and she was also greatly influenced by Eileen Chang. Chu weaves an eclectic tapestry of culture through the personal history and musings of her mentor. Chu published her first novel in 1972. In 1983, Chu adapted the award-winning novel "Growing Up" into a screenplay for the screen. Besides winning the Best Adapted Screenplay Award of the 20th Golden Horse Award, Chu also co-produced the soundtrack. 

During the period of Tamkang University, Chu served as the chief editor of The Threes journal (Sansan jikan 三三集刊), The Threes magazine (Sansan zazhi 三三雜誌), and cofounded The Threes Bookstore Publisher (Sansan shufang 三三書坊) with her sister and friends. In 1985, she wrote the screenplay "The Time to Live and the Time to Die" and won the best original screenplay award in the 22nd Taiwan Golden Horse Award. Some of her notable novels are Fin-de-Siècle Splendour (世紀末的華麗, 1990), Notes of a Desolate Man (荒人手記, 1994), and Witch's Brew (巫言, 2008). She wrote many of the scripts for the famous Taiwanese director Hou Hsiao-hsien. Her screenwriting credits include movies like Taipei Story, The Puppetmaster, Goodbye South, Goodbye, Millennium Mambo, City of Sadness 悲情城市 (1989) and many more. 

Chu was named the winner of the 2015 Newman Prize for Chinese Literature for Fin-de-Siècle Splendour, making her the first female writer to win the award. When Chu came to the University of Oklahoma to receive the Newman Prize in early March 2015, she participated in the Chinese Cinema Salon funded by the Presidential Dream Course on Chinese Cinema. Chu has been awarded Best Screenplay at the international Venice Film Festival and the Tokyo International Film Festival.

Works translated to English

Filmography

Films

TV series (incomplete)
1982 Guarding Sunlight, Guarding You (守著陽光守著你)?
1989 Sweet Baby (甜蜜寶貝)

Film awards

References

External links

1956 births
Living people
Writers from Taipei
Taiwanese women novelists
Taiwanese screenwriters
Tamkang University alumni
Taiwanese women short story writers